Valley Stream State Park is a  state park located in the village of Valley Stream in Nassau County, New York. The park is one of three state parks located in the Town of Hempstead on Long Island. Like Hempstead Lake State Park, Valley Stream State Park contained Cornell's Pond, a feeder reservoir for the Ridgewood Reservoir.

This park opened in 1928 together with Southern State Parkway, Hempstead Lake State Park, Belmont Lake State Park, and Heckscher State Park. Initially the park included Cornell's Pond, which had a freshwater beach that charged an admission fee of 10 cents. Crowded and unsanitary conditions led local residents to lobby for its closing in 1947. In 1958, the state to transferred the park's southern portion with this pond to the Village of Valley Stream. It reopened as the village-operated Arthur J. Hendrickson Park.

Valley Stream State Park is a day-use facility, convenient to the Southern State Parkway (exit 15A). The park offers a nature trail, cross-country skiing, a playground and playing fields, horseshoe, volleyball, basketball, and bocce ball courts, picnic tables and pavilions, fireplaces and grills, and recreation programs. Pets are not permitted.

See also
 List of New York state parks

References

External links

 New York State Parks: Valley Stream State Park
 Hidden Waters of NYC: Valley Stream

Valley Stream, New York
State parks of New York (state)
Robert Moses projects
Parks in Nassau County, New York
Urban public parks